Ab Qanat-e Eshkaft Dudar (also Romanized as Āb Qanāt-e Eshkaft Dūdar) is a village in Poshteh-ye Zilayi Rural District, Sarfaryab District, Charam County, Kohgiluyeh and Boyer-Ahmad Province, Iran. Its population in 2006 was 33, in 6 families.

References 

Populated places in Charam County